Tursac is a commune in the Dordogne department in Nouvelle-Aquitaine in southwestern France. Abri de la Madeleine is the site of Magdalenian prehistoric finds.

Population

See also
Communes of the Dordogne department

References

Communes of Dordogne